Streptomyces macrosporus is a bacterium species from the genus of Streptomyces which has been isolated from sewage, compost and soil.

See also 
 List of Streptomyces species

References

Further reading

External links
Type strain of Streptomyces macrosporus at BacDive -  the Bacterial Diversity Metadatabase	

macrosporus
Bacteria described in 1988